Events in the year 1999 in Hong Kong.

Incumbents
 Chief Executive: Tung Chee-hwa

Events
 22 August - China Airlines Flight 642 crashed at Hong Kong International Airport resulting in 3 fatalities and over 200 people getting injured.
 The Ng Ka Ling v Director of Immigration and Lau Kong Yung v Director of Immigration cases, regarding the Right of abode in Hong Kong was decided.
 Hello Kitty murder

See also
 List of Hong Kong films of 1999

References

 
Years of the 20th century in Hong Kong
Hong Kong
Hong Kong